DeAnna Marie Burt (born February 15, 1969) is a United States Space Force lieutenant general who has served as the deputy chief of space operations for operations, cyber, and nuclear since 2022. She previously served as the 
commander of Combined Force Space Component Command and vice commander of Space Operations Command from 2020 to 2022. She is the first woman to hold the rank of major general in the U.S. Space Force.

Burt entered the United States Air Force in 1991 as a distinguished graduate of the Air Force Reserve Officer Training Corps program at Embry-Riddle Aeronautical University. Her career has included numerous satellite operations and staff positions in Air Force Space Command and United States European Command. Burt has commanded the 2nd Space Operations Squadron, the 460th Operations Group, and the 50th Space Wing. She is a graduate and former instructor of the USAF Weapons School and a graduate of the School of Advanced Air and Space Studies. She also served as the vice commander of the United States Air Force Warfare Center, Nellis AFB, Nevada.

Education
1991 – Bachelor of Science degree in Aeronautical Engineering, Embry-Riddle Aeronautical University, Florida
1995 – Master of Science degree in Human Resources Management, Troy State University, Alabama
1997 – Squadron Officer School, Maxwell Air Force Base, Alabama
1999 – U.S. Air Force Weapons School, Distinguished Graduate and Academic Award, Nellis AFB, Nevada
2005 – Air Command and Staff College, Distinguished Graduate and Commandant's Leadership Award, Maxwell AFB, Alabama
2006 – School of Advanced Air and Space Studies, Maxwell AFB, Alabama
2012 – National War College, Distinguished Graduate, Fort McNair, Washington, D.C.
2015 – Leadership Enhancement Program, Center for Creative Leadership, North Carolina
2015 – Air Force Enterprise Leadership, UNC Kenan-Flagler Business School, North Carolina
2016 – Enterprise Perspective Seminar, Alan Freed Associates, Washington, D.C.
2020 Advanced Senior Leader Development Seminar, Arlie Center, Warrenton, Va.
2021 Combined Force Air Component Command Course, Maxwell AFB, Ala.

Military career

Burt was nominated for promotion to major general on May 4, 2020, and was confirmed in the rank by the United States Senate seventeen days later. She is the first woman to hold the rank of major general in the U.S. Space Force.

In October 2022, Burt was nominated for promotion to lieutenant general and assignment as deputy chief of space operations for operations, cyber, and nuclear.

Assignments

 October 1992 – January 1993, student, Undergraduate Space Training, Lowry Air Force Base, Colorado
 January 1993 – December 1995, crew commander, deputy flight commander, and chief of current operations, 4th Space Warning Squadron, Holloman AFB, New Mexico
 December 1995 – October 1997, chief of space systems tactical warning operations and chief of standardization and training, 76th Space Operations Squadron, Schriever AFB, Colorado
 October 1997 – January 1999, executive officer, Space Warfare Center, Schriever AFB, Colorado
 January 1999 – June 1999, student, USAF Weapons School Space Division, Nellis AFB, Nevada
 June 1999 – December 2001, instructor, assistant training flight commander, and training flight commander, USAF Weapons School Space Division, Nellis AFB, Nevada
 December 2001 – July 2004, theater missile defense operations officer and deputy chief of Special Technical Operations Branch, HQ U.S. European Command, Patch Barracks, Stuttgart, Germany
 July 2004 – June 2005, student, Intermediate Developmental Education, Air Command and Staff College, Maxwell AFB, Alabama
 July 2005 – June 2006, student, School of Advanced Air and Space Studies, Maxwell AFB, Alabama
 June 2006 – July 2008, chief of Combat Plans Division, Joint Space Operations Center, Vandenberg AFB, California
 August 2008 – August 2010, commander of 2nd Space Operations Squadron, Schriever AFB, Colorado
 August 2010 – August 2011, AFSPC chief of Positioning, Navigation and Timing Requirements Division, Peterson AFB, Colorado
 August 2011 – June 2012, student, National War College, Fort McNair, Washington, D.C.
 June 2012 – August 2014, commander of 460th Operations Group, Buckley AFB, Colorado
 August 2014 – May 2015, director of Commander's Action Group, Peterson AFB, Colorado
 May 2015 – July 2017, commander, 50th Space Wing, Schriever AFB, Colorado
 July 2017 – July 2018, vice commander, United States Air Force Warfare Center, Nellis AFB, Nevada
 July 2018 – November 2020, Director of Operations and Communications, Headquarters Space Operations Command, Peterson AFB, Colo.
 November 2020 – August 2022, Commander, Combined Force Space Component, U.S. Space Command, and Vice Commander, Space Operations Command, U.S. Space Force, Vandenberg Space Force Base, Calif.
 August 2022 – present, Special Assistant to the Vice Chief of Space Operations, Pentagon, Arlington, Va.

Awards and decorations

Burt is the recipient of the following awards:

Dates of promotion

References

 

 
 

 

 
 

 

 

 

Living people
Place of birth missing (living people)
Embry–Riddle Aeronautical University alumni
Troy University alumni
Office of the Chief of Space Operations personnel
United States Air Force generals
United States Space Force generals
Recipients of the Air Force Distinguished Service Medal
Recipients of the Legion of Merit
Female generals of the United States Air Force
1969 births
21st-century American women